Bartolomé Jaimes (c. 1522 – 14 November 1603) was a Spanish nobleman, who served in the conquest of Perú, Chile and Tucumán. He participated in the founding of the city of Córdoba by Jerónimo Luis de Cabrera.

Biography
He was born in Ayamonte, Huelva (Spain), the son of Alonso González Jaimes and Marina Sánchez, belonging to a noble family originally from Andalusia.

Jaimes had an active participation in the Spanish Conquest of the Americas. He possibly arrived in Peru around the year 1540. In 1547, he had participated in the Battle of Huarina, under the command of General Diego Centeno against the hosts of Gonzalo Pizarro. He accompanied Pedro de Valdivia in the Conquest of Chile and participated with great value in the Arauco War. 

Bartolomé Jaimes also participated of the Conquest of Tucumán, and attended the foundation of Santiago del Estero by Francisco de Aguirre in 1553,  and of Córdoba by Jerónimo Luis de Cabrera. He served as Alcalde of Córdoba in 1581, and was elect as Regidor of the Cabildo in 1575, 1577, 1579 and 1584. His last prominent public post, was as Fiel Ejecutor in 1590 and 1599.

On May 17, 1579, Bartolomé Jaimes received land grants in Córdoba, including the village of Ansenuza, and Caroya, where he requested permission to establish a cattle ranch. He made his will on the same day of his death, on November 14, 1603, being buried in the Iglesia Mayor de Córdoba.

Family 

Bartolomé Jaimes was married four times to native women of South America. His wives Catalina and Ana, were Mapuche, and Isabel, born in Catamarca was of Diaguita origin. His last wife was Luisa Martín, a mixed Indian, daughter of Alonso Martín del Arroyo, a Spanish politician, who served as Procurador of Santiago del Estero.

His descendant, Antonio Jaimes (born in Córdoba) was the founder of the Jaime family in Buenos Aires. In 1692, he was married in the Buenos Aires Cathedral to María de la Rosa Fernández, born in Buenos Aires. His son, Juan Jaimes Fernández was married to Juana Chiclana Navarro, daughter of Diego Chiclana (soldier) and Luisa Navarro Estebáñez de Cevallos, belonging to a noble family from Buenos Aires of Basque origin (related to Coutinho de Mendoza).

Antonio Jaimes served as soldier of the Presidio de Buenos Aires in 1690s and 1710s. He was possibly the great-grandson of Juan Maldonado and Lucía González Jaimes Díaz (daughter of Bartolomé Jaimes). His granddaughter, Josepha Lucía Jaimes Chiclana was married to Joseph Antonio Roberto. This family (Roberto Jaimes) was related to numerous Argentinean families, including the family of Casimiro Alegre, alcalde and Captain of Militias of San Vicente, Buenos Aires.

His most renowned descendant (non-direct line) was Domingo Faustino Sarmiento, President of the Argentine Republic between 1868 and 1864. The surname Jaimes or Jaime is originally from Aragon. Ancient sources indicated that the surname came from the knight Ruiz Perez de Jaimes (descendant of James I of Aragon), who had participated in the Granada War.

Notes

External links
www.capilladelmonte.gov.ar

1522 births
1603 deaths
Spanish military personnel
Spanish colonial governors and administrators
Spanish nobility
People of the Arauco War
Andalusian conquistadors
Spanish colonization of the Americas